WSUW (91.7 FM) is a radio station  broadcasting an Alternative format. The station is licensed to the Board of Regents, University of Wisconsin System and serves the Whitewater and Fort Atkinson areas.

History
WSUW has been broadcasting from the UW-Whitewater campus since 1966.

References

External links

SUW
SUW